Aleksander Stokkebø  (born 2 November 1994) is a Norwegian politician from the Conservative Party. He has served as an MP from Rogaland since 2021.

Political career

Parliament
He was elected deputy representative to the Storting for the period 2017–2021 for the Conservative Party. He deputised for Bent Høie in the Storting from 2017 to 2021, before winning a permanent seat in the 2021 election.

References

1994 births
Living people
Conservative Party (Norway) politicians
Members of the Storting